The Chhattisgarh Vidhan Sabha or the Chhattisgarh Legislative Assembly is the unicameral state legislature of Chhattisgarh state in India.

The seat of the Vidhan Sabha is at Raipur, the capital of the state. The Vidhan Sabha comprises 90 Members of Legislative Assembly, which include 90 members directly elected from single-seat constituency. Its term is 5 years, unless sooner dissolved.

History

The state of Chhattisgarh was created by the Madhya Pradesh Reorganization Act 2000, approved by the President of India on 25 August 2000. The Chhattisgarh Vidhan Sabha came into existence with the creation of the state on 1 November 2000. The first session of the Chhattisgarh Vidhan Sabha was held at Jashpur hall of Rajkumar College in Raipur. Later, the Vidhan Sabha was shifted to the newly constructed Chhattisgarh Vidhan Sabha Bhavan at Vidhan Nagar, on Raipur–Baloda Bazar Road.A new building for Vidhan Sabha is under construction at Sector 19, Atal Nagar behind Indravati Bhawan & Mahanadi Bhawan. The groundbreaking ceremony was done by Bhupesh Baghel on 29 August 2020 in the presence of leaders like Rahul Gandhi, Sonia Gandhi and other ministers. The construction is currently halted since 2021 and all tenders are cancelled by the Government of Chhattisgarh due to the COVID-19 pandemic in Chhattisgarh. The inauguration is expected to be on or after 2025.

Sessions
Chhattisgarh Vidhan Sabha sits for three sessions (Budget, Monsoon & Winter).

List of Assemblies

Members of Legislative Assembly

Notes

References

Further reading

External links
 Chhattisgarh Lok Sabha Election 2019 Results Website
 Chhattisgarh Vidhan Sabha website
 Chhattisgarh assembly elections 2013 details

 
State legislatures of India
Politics of Chhattisgarh
Government of Chhattisgarh
2000 establishments in Chhattisgarh
Unicameral legislatures